This is a list of diplomatic missions of Norway, excluding honorary consulates.

In countries without Norwegian representation, Norwegian citizens can seek assistance from public officials in the foreign services of any of the other Nordic countries, in accordance with the Helsinki Treaty.

Current missions

Africa

Americas

Asia

Europe

Oceania

Multilateral organizations

Gallery

Closed missions

Africa

Americas

Asia

Europe

See also

 Foreign relations of Norway
 Norwegian Ministry of Foreign Affairs
 List of diplomatic missions of the Nordic countries

Notes

References

External links
 Ministry of Foreign Affairs of Norway

 
Norway
Diplomatic missions